Victor Feller (22 February 1923 – 24 December 1997) was a Luxembourgian footballer. He competed in the men's tournament at the 1948 Summer Olympics.

References

External links
 

1923 births
1997 deaths
Luxembourgian footballers
Luxembourg international footballers
Olympic footballers of Luxembourg
Footballers at the 1948 Summer Olympics
People from Dudelange
Association football midfielders